Maria Pia may refer to:

People
 Princess Maria Pia of Savoy (1847–1911), married to Luís I of Portugal
 Princess Maria Pia of Bourbon-Two Sicilies (1849–1882), married to Robert I, Duke of Parma
 Princess Maria Pia delle Grazie of Two Sicilies (1878–1973), married to Prince Luiz of Orléans-Braganza
 Princess Maria Pia of Bourbon-Parma (born 1934), married to Prince Alexander of Yugoslavia
 Princess Maria-Pia of Liechtenstein (born 1960), daughter of Prince Karl Alfred and Archduchess Agnes Christina of Austria
 Maria Pia of Saxe-Coburg and Braganza (1907-1995), claimed to be an illegitimate daughter of King Carlos I of Portugal
 Maria Pia De Vito, Italian jazz singer, composer, and arranger
 Maria Pia Garavaglia (born 19470), Italian politician
 María Pía Copello, host of the Peruvian television program Maria Pia & Timoteo

Other uses
 Maria Pia Bridge, a railway bridge in Porto, Portugal